That's Carry On! is a 1977 British comedy film, the 29th release in the series of 31 Carry On films (1958–1992). The film is a compilation of the highlights of most of the previous 28 films, and features series regulars Kenneth Williams and Barbara Windsor as co-presenters.  It was Windsor's 10th and final appearance in the series.  The idea for the film was inspired by Metro-Goldwyn-Mayer's popular That's Entertainment! series of documentaries. It was released in 1977 as a supporting feature to the Richard Harris film, Golden Rendezvous. The film was followed by "Carry On Emmannuelle"  in 1978.

Plot
Kenneth Williams and Barbara Windsor are imprisoned in a Pinewood Studios projection room and trawl through film can after film can of the Carry On series. Kenneth is delighted with the slap-up food hamper and champagne, while Barbara loads the vintage clips. As the films remorselessly play out, Kenneth feels the need to relieve himself but Barbara is determined to plough through every film. Finally, scenes of speedy roadside urinating from Carry On at Your Convenience prove too much for Kenneth to bear but he holds back the flow to enjoy his finest role as the Khasi in Carry On... Up the Khyber. While Kenneth pontificates about the glories of the Empire, Barbara leaves the projection room and locks her co-star in.  Unable to hold out any longer, Kenneth goes against the projection room door.

Cast
Kenneth Williams as himself
Barbara Windsor as herself

Crew
Screenplay - Tony Church
Archive Material - Talbot Rothwell, Norman Hudis, Sid Colin & Dave Freeman
Music - Eric Rogers
Director of Photography - Tony Imi
Editor - Jack Gardner
Production Manager - Roy Goddard
Dubbing Editor - Christopher Lancaster
Sound Recordists - Danny Daniel & Ken Barker
Titles - GSE Ltd
Producer - Peter Rogers
Director - Gerald Thomas

Bibliography

Keeping the British End Up: Four Decades of Saucy Cinema by Simon Sheridan (third edition) (2007) (Reynolds & Hearn Books)

External links 
 
That's Carry On at The Whippit Inn

1978 films
Carry On films
1970s English-language films
Films directed by Gerald Thomas
1977 comedy films
1977 films
Compilation films
British anthology films
Films produced by Peter Rogers
1978 comedy films
1970s British films